J. Craig Wright (June 21, 1929 – February 3, 2010) was a former Republican justice of the Ohio Supreme Court who served in that office from 1985 to 1996.

Justice Wright was born June 21, 1929, in Chillicothe, Ohio to Harry Jr. and Marjorie Riddle Wright and grew up in Lima, Ohio. He graduated from Woodberry Forest School in 1947, received a bachelor's degree from the University of Kentucky in 1951 and graduated from Yale Law School in 1954. From 1955 through 1956, he served as a special agent in the U.S. Army Counter Intelligence Corps. Upon completion of his military service, he entered private practice with the law firm of Wright, Gilbert and Jones in Columbus, Ohio.

His judicial career began with his election to the Franklin County Common Pleas Court in 1970, where he served as a judge in The General Division for 14 years.

He defeated incumbent Justice James P. Celebrezze in November 1984 to win election to his first term on the Supreme Court and was re-elected in 1990. He was replaced by Justice Evelyn Lundberg Stratton after retiring from the Supreme Court in 1996.

Following his retirement from the Supreme Court, Justice Wright entered private practice in Columbus, Ohio. He retired from private practice in 2003 and served by assignment of the Chief Justice on the Ohio Court of Claims through 2009.

In addition to his judicial and legal activities, Justice Wright was appointed by Governor Bob Taft to serve on the Ohio Chemical Dependency Professionals Board from 2003 to 2006 and, at the time of his death, he was serving on the Ohio Public Defender Commission pursuant to an appointment from the Supreme Court.

Justice Wright's legacy includes participation with other lawyers and judges in establishing one of the first efforts in the nation to address substance abuse in the legal profession. This effort was a precursor to the Ohio Lawyers Assistance Program  that has provided drug and alcohol dependency and mental illness treatment services to thousands of Ohio judges, lawyers, and law students since 1991.

"Craig Wright was an extraordinary jurist," said Chief Justice Thomas J. Moyer. "His intellect and his years of experience in the law served him well as a trial judge and justice of the Supreme Court of Ohio. Craig's work in the field of alcohol and chemical addiction extended and improved the lives of hundreds of people. I have lost a good friend."

Justice Wright is survived by two daughters, Marjorie Jane and Alice Ann, three grandchildren, a sister, Patricia Wright Klitgaard and a brother, Michael Wright. He was preceded in death by his wife, the former Jane LaFollette and his two brothers: Thornton and Harry Wright III.

References 

Ohio Chemical Dependency Professionals Board 

Ohio Republicans
Justices of the Ohio Supreme Court
Yale Law School alumni
University of Kentucky alumni
2010 deaths
1929 births
Lawyers from Columbus, Ohio
Politicians from Chillicothe, Ohio
Military personnel from Ohio
Woodberry Forest School alumni
20th-century American judges